The 2018 IIHF World Championship Division I was an international ice hockey tournament run by the International Ice Hockey Federation.

The Group A tournament was held in Budapest, Hungary and the Group B tournament was held in Kaunas, Lithuania from 22 to 28 April 2018. Warsaw, Poland planned on bidding for the tournament, but as Poland had hosted both the 2015 and 2016 tournaments, decided to apply for a later year.

Great Britain and Italy were promoted to the Top Division, while Poland was relegated to Division I B. The Group B tournament was won by Lithuania, who moved up to Group A and Croatia was relegated to Division II.

Group A tournament

Participants

Match officials
7 referees and 7 linesmen were selected for the tournament.

Referees
 Alex Dipietro
 Lasse Heikkinen
 Oldřich Hejduk
 Jeff Ingram
 Marc Iwert
 Trpimir Piragić
 Ladislav Smetana

Linesmen
 Thomas Caillot
 Michael Harrington
 Ludvig Lundgren
 Márton Németh
 Marc-Henri Progin
 Daniel Soós
 Josef Špůr

Standings

Results
All times are local (UTC+2).

Awards and statistics

Awards
Best players selected by the directorate:
Best Goaltender:  Ádám Vay
Best Defenseman:  Ben O'Connor
Best Forward:  Jan Urbas
Source: IIHF.com

Media All-Stars:
 MVP:  Brett Perlini
 Goaltender:  Ádám Vay
 Defenceman:  Ben O'Connor /  Sabahudin Kovačević
 Forwards:  Brett Perlini /  Roman Starchenko /  Balázs Sebők
Source: IIHF.com

Scoring leaders
List shows the top skaters sorted by points, then goals.

GP = Games played; G = Goals; A = Assists; Pts = Points; +/− = Plus/minus; PIM = Penalties in minutes; POS = Position
Source: IIHF.com

Leading goaltenders
Only the top five goaltenders, based on save percentage, who have played at least 40% of their team's minutes, are included in this list.

TOI = Time on Ice (minutes:seconds); SA = Shots against; GA = Goals against; GAA = Goals against average; Sv% = Save percentage; SO = Shutouts
Source: IIHF.com

Group B tournament

Participants

Match officials
4 referees and 7 linesmen were selected for the tournament.

Referees
 Damien Bliek
 Miha Bulovec
 Stian Halm
 Liam Sewell

Linesmen
 Karolis Janušauskas
 Andreas Kroyer
 Ivan Nedeljković
 Tommi Niittylä
 Elias Seewald
 Laurynas Stepankevičius
 Roman Výleta

Standings

Results
All times are local (UTC+3).

Awards and statistics

Awards
Best players selected by the directorate:
Best Goaltender:  Villem-Henrik Koitmaa
Best Defenseman:  Ryo Hashimoto
Best Forward:  Arnoldas Bosas
Source: IIHF.com

Scoring leaders
List shows the top skaters sorted by points, then goals.

GP = Games played; G = Goals; A = Assists; Pts = Points; +/− = Plus/minus; PIM = Penalties in minutes; POS = Position
Source: IIHF.com

Leading goaltenders
Only the top five goaltenders, based on save percentage, who have played at least 40% of their team's minutes, are included in this list.

TOI = Time on Ice (minutes:seconds); SA = Shots against; GA = Goals against; GAA = Goals against average; Sv% = Save percentage; SO = Shutouts
Source: IIHF.com

References

2018
Division I
2018 IIHF World Championship Division I
2018 IIHF World Championship Division I
International sports competitions in Budapest
Sports competitions in Kaunas
2018 in Hungarian sport
2018 in Lithuanian sport
April 2018 sports events in Europe